Joe Bertram, Sr. (born July 3, 1954) is an American politician who served in the Minnesota Senate from 1981 to 1996 as (DFL) State Senator from Paynesville in District 14.

Bertram was accused of shoplifting a leather vest and trying to bribe the store owner into not reporting it in 1996.  His brother, State Representative Jeff Bertram then began threatening people to not report other behaviors by his brother, for which Jeff Bertram was Censured. The Senate was beginning expulsion talks for Joe Bertram when pled guilty and resigned.

References

1954 births
Living people
Democratic Party Minnesota state senators